Jamie Egan (born 1 July 2003) is an Irish professional footballer who plays as a defender for National League North club Hereford, on loan from Bristol Rovers.

Career

Bristol Rovers 
Egan joined Bristol Rovers' academy in 2020 having signed from Cabinteely in his native Ireland. He also featured in the youth teams of Bray Wanderers, Bohemians and St. Kevin's Boys.

On 10 September 2021 Egan joined Southern Football League Premier Division South club Yate Town on a two-month work experience loan.

On 15 January 2022 Egan joined National League North club Hereford on a one-month work experience loan. The loan was extended by a further month on 16 February.

On 12 May 2022 Egan signed his first professional contract with Bristol Rovers.

On 6 August 2022 Egan joined National League North club Gloucester City on a one-month youth loan.

On 3 February 2023 joined National League South club Weymouth on a one-month loan.

On 4 March 2023 Egan returned to Hereford on loan for the remainder of the season. He made his second debut for the club the same day in a 1–0 league home win against Kettering.

References

External links 

 Jamie Egan profile at the Bristol Rovers F.C. website
 
 

2003 births
Living people
Irish footballers
Association football defenders
Hereford F.C. players